Alvent Yulianto Chandra (born 11 July 1980) is a badminton player from Indonesia. Born in Glenmore, Banyuwangi, East Java, he has been playing badminton since he was 10 years old in a club named Suryanaga Gudang Garam Surabaya.

Personal life 
On 16 October 2021, Yulianto married Freeisy Ester Sompie, also an Indonesian badminton player. Their holy matrimony was held at GMIM Sion Tumaluntung, North Minahasa.

Career 
Yulianto is a men's doubles specialist. In 2004, he and partner Luluk Hadiyanto won four top tier tournaments on the international circuit, the Indonesia, Korea, Singapore, and Thailand Opens. They gained a number one world ranking that year despite an early loss in the 2004 Athens Olympics. Since 2004, Hadiyanto and Yulianto have struggled to achieve top form. In 2006, they captured a bronze medal at the Asian Championships in Johor Bahru, Malaysia. Second place finishes in the quadrennial 2006 Asian Games; the 2007 Japan and 2008 Korea Opens have been their highest finishes in major international tournaments, though they won the Indonesian national title in 2007.

After a disappointing 21–19, 14–21, 14–21, first round loss against the Japanese Keita Masuda and Tadashi Ohtsuka at the 2008 Olympics with Luluk Hadiyanto, the couple split partnership. Yulianto then partnered Hendra Aprida Gunawan till 2012. They reached the finals at the 2009 Philippines Open and were also runners-up at the 2011 Malaysia and Thailand Opens. At the 2012 Thomas Cup, Yulianto then played with Mohammad Ahsan defending the Indonesian colors. After this event, he played with Tri Kusumawardana at the 2012 Victor Indonesian International Challenge. Thereafter Yulianto progressed as an independent player for Indonesia with experienced partner Markis Kido winning the Dutch Open and reaching semi-finals at the Macau and 2013 Swiss Open. After a disappointing third round loss at the 2013 BWF World Championships, Yulianto and Kido split up the partnership. Yulianto then started a partnership with Japanese player Shintaro Ikeda, this partnership lasted till the Indonesian Open in June 2014. Thereafter Yulianto partnered his compatriot Yonathan Suryatama Dasuki.

Participation at Indonesian Team 
 4 times at Sudirman Cup (2003, 2005, 2007, 2011)
 4 times at Thomas Cup (2004, 2006, 2010, 2012)

Achievements

World Championships 
Men's doubles

Asian Games 
Men's doubles

Asian Championships 
Men's doubles

Southeast Asian Games 
Men's doubles

BWF Superseries (4 runners-up) 
The BWF Superseries, which was launched on 14 December 2006 and implemented in 2007, is a series of elite badminton tournaments, sanctioned by the Badminton World Federation (BWF). BWF Superseries levels are Superseries and Superseries Premier. A season of Superseries consists of twelve tournaments around the world that have been introduced since 2011. Successful players are invited to the Superseries Finals, which are held at the end of each year.

Men's doubles

  BWF Superseries Finals tournament
  BWF Superseries Premier tournament
  BWF Superseries tournament

BWF Grand Prix (5 titles, 7 runners-up) 
The BWF Grand Prix had two levels, the BWF Grand Prix and Grand Prix Gold. It was a series of badminton tournaments sanctioned by the Badminton World Federation (BWF) which was held from 2007 to 2017. The World Badminton Grand Prix sanctioned by International Badminton Federation (IBF) from 1983 to 2006.

Men's doubles

  BWF Grand Prix Gold tournament
  BWF/IBF Grand Prix tournament

BWF International Challenge/Series (1 title, 1 runner-up) 
Men's doubles

Mixed doubles

  BWF International Challenge tournament
  BWF/IBF International Series tournament

Performance timeline

National team 
 Senior level

Individual competitions 
 Senior level

References

External links 
 
 

1980 births
Living people
People from Banyuwangi Regency
Sportspeople from East Java
Indonesian male badminton players
Badminton players at the 2004 Summer Olympics
Badminton players at the 2008 Summer Olympics
Olympic badminton players of Indonesia
Badminton players at the 2006 Asian Games
Badminton players at the 2010 Asian Games
Asian Games silver medalists for Indonesia
Asian Games bronze medalists for Indonesia
Asian Games medalists in badminton
Medalists at the 2006 Asian Games
Medalists at the 2010 Asian Games
Competitors at the 2003 Southeast Asian Games
Competitors at the 2005 Southeast Asian Games
Competitors at the 2007 Southeast Asian Games
Southeast Asian Games gold medalists for Indonesia
Southeast Asian Games silver medalists for Indonesia
Southeast Asian Games bronze medalists for Indonesia
Southeast Asian Games medalists in badminton
World No. 1 badminton players
21st-century Indonesian people
20th-century Indonesian people